Gregory Manusky (born August 12, 1966) is an American football coach who currently serves as the inside linebackers coach for the Denver Broncos. Manusky started his coaching career as a linebacker coach for two teams over six seasons. From there, he transitioned to a defensive coordinator for four teams over 12 seasons, totaling 19 seasons as a defensive coach. Prior to coaching, Manusky played as a linebacker in the National Football League (NFL) for three teams over 12 seasons. Manusky played college football at Colgate University and high school football at Dallas High School.

Coaching career

Washington Redskins

After 12 years of playing for three different teams, including the Washington Redskins, the Minnesota Vikings, and the Kansas City Chiefs, Manusky began his coaching career in 2001 as a linebacker coach under Marty Schottenheimer at the Washington Redskins.

San Diego Chargers

Following his first season as a linebacker coach in Washington, the San Diego Chargers hired him as their outside linebackers coach. He remained in this position for six years. After the San Diego Chargers ended their season 14–2, Manusky was offered a defensive coordinator position with the San Francisco 49ers in 2007.

San Francisco 49ers

Manusky spent four years as the San Francisco 49ers under 49ers head coach Mike Singletary. After the 2010 season, Singeltary was fired by the team. Former Stanford University head coach Jim Harbaugh replaced Singletary.  Harbaugh gave Manusky permission to interview with other teams. Manusky ultimately accepted the defensive coordinator job with the Chargers, with whom he had previously worked as a linebackers coach.

San Diego Chargers

Manusky spent a year as a defensive coordinator for the San Diego Chargers. After an 8–8 season, the Chargers decided to part ways with Manusky. Subsequently, the Indianapolis Colts named him as their defensive coordinator for the 2012 season.

Indianapolis Colts

The Indianapolis Colts hired Manusky as their defensive coordinator on February 2, 2012. He spent four years under head coach Chuck Pagano. After four seasons, he was fired by the Colts on January 5, 2016.

Washington Redskins (second stint)
On January 22, 2016, Manusky was hired to be the outside linebackers coach for the Washington Redskins. A year later, the Redskins promoted him to defensive coordinator. 

In the 2018 season, safety D. J. Swearinger publicly criticized Manusky and his play calling following the team's Week 16 loss to the Tennessee Titans. Despite being one of the better defensive players on the team that season, Swearinger was released the next day by head coach Jay Gruden for his comments against the Manusky.

Manusky left the team among staff turnover after the Redskins hired Ron Rivera as their new head coach following the 2019 season.

University of Kentucky

He then joined the University of Kentucky's football team to be one of their defensive quality control assistants in 2020.

Minnesota Vikings
On March 1, 2022, Manusky was hired as the inside linebackers coach for the Minnesota Vikings under new head coach Kevin O'Connell. On February 19, 2023, the Vikings fired him following the hiring of Brian Flores as their new defensive coordinator.

Denver Broncos
On February 25, 2023, the Denver Broncos announced the hiring of Manusky as their inside linebackers coach under new head coach Sean Payton.

Playing career
Manusky signed with the Washington Redskins and remained with them from 1988 to 1990 under Joe Gibbs. After two seasons with the Washington Redskins, Manusky played with the Minnesota Vikings from 1991 to 1993 under Dennis Green. During his time with Minnesota, he was selected to the all-Madden Team in 1991. After two seasons with Minnesota, Manusky finished out his playing career with the Kansas City Chiefs from 1994 to 1999. After ending a 12-year playing career in 1999, Manusky entered the coaching ranks in the National Football League.

References

External links
 Kentucky Wildcats bio

1966 births
Living people
American football linebackers
Colgate Raiders football players
Kansas City Chiefs players
Kentucky Wildcats football coaches
Minnesota Vikings players
National Football League defensive coordinators
San Diego Chargers coaches
San Francisco 49ers coaches
Washington Redskins coaches
Washington Redskins players
People from Luzerne County, Pennsylvania
Players of American football from Pennsylvania
Minnesota Vikings coaches